The Kissel Motor Car Company was an American automobile and truck manufacturer founded by Louis Kissel and his sons, in Hartford, Wisconsin. The company custom built high-quality automobiles, hearses, fire trucks, taxicabs, and trucks from their plant at 123 Kissel Avenue in Hartford.

History

Conrad Kissel (b.1812, d. 1872) emigrated from Prussia to Addison in Washington County, Wisconsin in 1857. His son, Louis C. Kissel, moved to Hartford, Wisconsin, in 1883.  In 1890, Louis, in a partnership with his four sons Adolph P., Otto P., William L. and George A., opened Kissel Hardware Store, the Hartford Plow Company that manufactured and distributed farm machinery, Kissel Manufacturing Company, and the Hartford Electric Company. Through Kissel Manufacturing Company, they distributed engines for various manufacturers and developed their own gasoline engines including outboard boat motors. The partnership was also involved in home building and sales through, a stone quarry, sand pit, and facilities for milling their own finished lumber. In 1906 Otto formed the First National Bank of Hartford as a principal shareholder and became Vice-President. In 1925 Otto was elected president and held that position until retiring in January 1933.

In 1906 the Kissel Motor Car Company was incorporated by Louis, his four sons, and US District Attorney H. K. Butterfield. The company began production in 1907. Kissel prospered after the war but with stiff competition and the Great Depression, mounting losses, and an attempted hostile take-over by New Era Motors' president Archie Andrews, forced Kissel to file for receivership protection in November 1930.

Kissel Kar, Kissel 
In 1907 the Kissel Motor Car Company, advertised as "Kissel Kar".  Approximately 200 of the 35,000 automobiles the company produced are known to exist today along with at least one of the Kissel-built FWD Model B trucks. The Wisconsin Automotive Museum of Hartford has several of these remaining cars on display. The most famous car was one the company donated to Hollywood actress Anita King for her transcontinental trip in 1915 that marked the first-ever such trip by a female driving alone. The most popular Kissel model was the 1919 thru 1927 Speedster, nicknamed the Gold Bug. The two passenger (sometimes four-passenger) Gold Bug was owned by famous personalities of the time such as actor Fatty Arbuckle and aviator Amelia Earhart. Beginning in 1927, Kissel also produced the sporty White Eagle Speedster.

Gold Bug 

The car Kissel referred to as a "speedster" was widely known as the Gold Bug. The car was popular with many other celebrities including Amelia Earhart, Bebe Daniels, Jack Dempsey, Ralph DePalma, Eddie Duchin, Douglas Fairbanks, Greta Garbo, Gladys George, Ruby Keeler, William S. Hart, Al Jolson, Mabel Normand, Mary Pickford, and Rudy Vallee. A 1923 Gold Bug (model 6-45), one of four survivors from that model and year, was owned by Andrew Kissel and William Ruger. The 1927 Kissel Gold Bug Coupe Roadster was used in the movie The Eddy Duchin Story in 1956. 

The only remaining 1921 Kissel Gold Bug Speedster won "Best in Class - Vintage Era Sporting" at the 2018 Pebble Beach Concours d'Elegance and won "Best in Class - American Spirit - 1920 to 1931" at the 2019 Elegance at Hershey. 

Kissel used Mercury as its logo. In the late 1930s, Henry Ford requested use of the logo for a new marque the Ford Motor Company was planning to introduce, and permission was granted.

Kissel Trucks 
Kissel manufactured trucks of 3/4, 1, 2, 3, 4, and 5 tons, and maintained a sales office at 2515 Michigan Avenue in Chicago, Illinois in early 1913. In 1915 the company (542 Kissel Ave.) advertised in the National Lumberman the new models that included a 1000 lb. and 6 ton replaced the 5 ton. 

During World War I the company produced trucks for the US military and for the allies prior to the U.S. entry into the war. In June 1915 Kissel shipped 30 ambulances and 50 heavy service trucks to the Kingdom of Serbia. By 1918 Kissel was producing FWD Model B 3 ton "Buddy" trucks (not to be confused with the Standard B "Liberty" 3-ton truck) under license from the Clintonville, Wisconsin based Four Wheel Drive Auto Company for the U.S War Department.

West Bend Company 

In 1935, the Kissels manufactured outboard motors and were major suppliers of Sears, Roebuck. In 1942 the business was sold to the West Bend Aluminum Company.

Advertisements

References

Sources
Clymer, Floyd. Treasury of Early American Automobiles, 1877-1925. New York: Bonanza Books, 1950.

Motor vehicle manufacturers based in Wisconsin
Defunct motor vehicle manufacturers of the United States
Defunct companies based in Wisconsin
1900s cars
1910s cars
1920s cars
1930s cars
Vehicle manufacturing companies established in 1906
1906 establishments in Wisconsin
Brass Era vehicles
Vintage vehicles
Luxury motor vehicle manufacturers
Pre-war vehicles